RMU may refer to:

Instruments
Ring Main Unit, electrical instrument

Universities
Robert Morris University
Robert Morris University Illinois
Rawalpindi Medical University

Others
 Región de Murcia International Airport